Bearskin Lake is a lake in Kenora District in northwestern Ontario, Canada. It is in the Hudson Bay drainage basin.

The main inflow is the Morrison River at the south. Two other unnamed inflows are at the south (east of the Morrison River) and southeast. The major outflow, at the north, is also the Morrison River, which flows via Sachigo Lake, the Sachigo River and the Severn River to Hudson Bay.

The lake was the original home of the Bearskin Lake First Nation until it moved to Michikan Lake,  to the northeast, in the 1930s.

See also
List of lakes in Ontario

References

Lakes of Kenora District